Brett Leaver (born 12 January 1970) is a former field hockey player from New Zealand, who finished in eighth position with the Men's National Team, nicknamed Black Sticks, at the 1992 Summer Olympics in Barcelona, Spain and finished his career with 157 test caps. He was born in Auckland. Achieving high in sports and getting awards, he became an athlete at Otahuhu College and then carried it on until he became an Olympian for New Zealand.

References
 New Zealand Olympic Committee

External links
 

New Zealand male field hockey players
Field hockey players at the 1992 Summer Olympics
Field hockey players at the 1998 Commonwealth Games
1998 Men's Hockey World Cup players
Olympic field hockey players of New Zealand
1970 births
Living people
Field hockey players from Auckland
People educated at Otahuhu College
Commonwealth Games competitors for New Zealand
20th-century New Zealand people
21st-century New Zealand people